, short for , is a Japanese light novel series written by Yūji Yūji, with illustrations provided by Ruroo. SoftBank Creative published eighteen main novels and one extra from February 2011 to February 2022. There have been four manga adaptations and an anime adaptation by A-1 Pictures aired from January to March 2013.

Plot
Eita Kidō enters high school with the goal of graduating with marks high enough that he can earn a scholarship to medical school. Due to the fact that his parents divorced, found new lovers, and left him in the care of his aunt, he shuns anything to do with romance or love. One day, the school's No.1 beauty, Masuzu Natsukawa, invites him to walk home with her. He quickly deduces that Masuzu is scheming something. It turns out Masuzu is tired of being the center of attention and receiving confessions on a nearly-every-day basis, so she suggests that she and Eita become a fake couple. Although Eita objects, Masuzu blackmails him into becoming her boyfriend in name only. News of the new couple rapidly spreads throughout the school and Eita's childhood friend, Chiwa Harusaki, who likes him, begins to vie with Masuzu for Eita's affections.

Characters

 (drama CD), Ryōta Ōsaka (anime)
Eita is the main character who aims to attend medical school after graduating from high school. He is very smart and always places at the top of the school exams. He has a strong distrust for love and romance because of his parents divorcing, finding new lovers, and abandoning him when he was in junior high school, thus calling himself "anti-romance". His antipathy to romance also stems from the fact that it would interfere with his studying. It is revealed that during junior high school, he had teenage delusions and thought of himself as "Burning Fighting Fighter". However, Chiwa's accident caused him to abandon his delusions and decide to become a doctor. Despite having outgrown his teenage delusions, he sometimes backslides if he gets too emotional.

 (drama CD), Yukari Tamura (anime)
Masuzu is Eita's "girlfriend". She is the school beauty who returned to Japan after spending nine years overseas. Like Eita, she hates romance, and is tired of receiving (and rejecting) confessions on a daily basis. Masuzu uses Eita's notebook from middle school, filled with embarrassing notes and scribbles, to blackmail him into pretending to be her boyfriend. She forms a club called "Maiden Society For Performing Your Own Life" where she studies how to become popular. When she is not with Eita, Masuzu presents a cold manner; but when she is with him, she is more outgoing, mischievous and cunning: she loves to use words to trick him. Like Chiwa, she is a terrible cook. Masuzu likes to quote scenes from the manga JoJo's Bizarre Adventure. She eventually falls in love with Eita without actually realizing it, and becomes jealous when he interacts with other girls.

Since she is Eita's "official" girlfriend, Chiwa, Himeka, and Ai often join forces against her when battling for him. Her family lives in Sweden and her relationship with them, especially with her father, is complicated and has influenced her twisted personality. Masuzu's father took her away from her mother so that people of his acquaintance with a higher social standing would accept him. However, because of this she had to learn to act and present a false face to society, eventually causing her to suffer from an identity crisis.

 (drama CD), Chinatsu Akasaki (anime)
Chiwa is Eita's childhood best friend. She is usually called "Chiwawa" (chihuahua) by her friends because of her petite physique and pair of twintails that resemble puppy's ears. She started attending the Kendo club in elementary school, but had to drop out the year before she entered high school due to a serious injury she suffered in a car accident. This event is the reason that Eita wants to pursue a medical career – so that he can help her recover fully from her injuries. She does not give up easily and constantly fights Masuzu for Eita's affections. She loves to eat and especially likes meat, but is a terrible cook herself. However, in the light novels she starts improving her cooking skills for Eita. She has had romantic feelings for Eita for years but was too shy to confess until Masuzu arrived in the picture. She finally confesses to Eita at the end of the fourth light novel, but is quickly interrupted by Masuzu and other girls. She dislikes seeing girls getting close to Eita but becomes fast friends with them.

Himeka is Eita's "ex-girlfriend", who has a one-sided crush on him. Himeka has teenage delusions, believing that in a previous life she was "Burning Princess Saint Dragon Lady of Dawn". Having witnessed Eita reveal some of his teenage delusions, she believes that Eita and she were a couple in her previous life. When not immersed in her delusions, Himeka is really quiet and usually only answers questions by nodding. Other girls often call her . After hearing of Ai's fake boyfriend story, she refers to Ai as the "Master of Love".

Ai is Eita's "fiancée" and childhood friend whom he knew a year before he met Chiwa and who moved away ten years ago but has recently returned. Ai considers herself to be the one for Eita because she confessed to him while they were in kindergarten and they even signed a makeshift marriage registration, making them engaged, although Eita didn't understand the concept of marriage. Ai has lied about having a boyfriend in college, and also keeps a notebook like Eita's. Nobody else except Kaoru and Himeka knows this. She often has delusions of herself and Eita as a couple. As a member of the student discipline committee, she attempts to stop Chiwa and Masuzu's club activities, but later decides to join the club to win Eita back.

Saeko is Eita's aunt whom he has lived with since his parents abandoned him. She works at a gaming company that makes mostly bishōjo games, is an expert with such games and always makes analogies of the real world to them with respect to girls. She is a workaholic who can survive long periods of time without sleep. Despite their protestations to the contrary, she knew immediately that Eita and Masuzu were not really a couple just by observation. She often gives Eita advice about getting along with girls and has even told him how to disengage himself from the other girls in case he has chosen one of them.

Kaoru is Eita's classmate and his best friend, who sat next to him until the seat change. Kaoru has known Ai since elementary school and calls her A-chan. While initially thought to be male, it is hinted in the story that Kaoru might actually be a girl, or in love with Eita. In the light novels, it is revealed that Kaoru is in fact a girl.

Mana is Masuzu's little sister, who is seen with a bodyguard at all times. She wants her older sister to come back to Sweden, and even reports on her activities to their father. Even though her relationship with Masuzu is complicated, she seems to love her sister.

Miharu is a character exclusive to the Ore no Kanojo to Osananajimi ga Shuraba Sugiru+H spin-off manga. She is the daughter of a middle school principal, who tries to capture Eita's affections. It is later revealed, she had a childhood friend named Keita Fujinami, whom she thought of as a brother and perhaps more. However, when Keita confessed to Masuzu, she (likewise) rejected him cruelly. The rejection affected him to the point he transferred to another school leaving a depressed Miharu behind. When she heard Masuzu now has a boyfriend, she seeks revenge for Keita by stealing Eita away from Masuzu, unaware Masuzu and Eita aren't really dating. After learning of Miharu's motives, Eita confronts her about her feelings for Keita and she gives up on revenge. She later transfers to Tokyo hoping to reunite with Keita; Masuzu gives her an envelope filled with her rejected love letters to encourage her and an application form to join their club for when she returns.

Media

Light novels
Ore no Kanojo to Osananajimi ga Shuraba Sugiru began as a light novel series written by Yūji Yūji, with illustrations by Ruroo. The first volume was published on February 15, 2011 under SoftBank Creative's GA Bunko imprint, and the eighteenth and last on February 15, 2022. A spin-off novel was also released on February 15, 2013.

Manga
A manga adaptation, illustrated by Nanasuke, was serialized between the July 2011 and April 2014 issues of Square Enix's Gangan Joker manga magazine. The series was compiled into seven tankōbon volumes published between December 15, 2011 and April 22, 2014. A four-panel comic strip manga, illustrated by Marimo and titled , was serialized in Square Enix's Young Gangan magazine between October 21, 2011, and April 5, 2013. The series was compiled into two tankōbon volumes, released on July 14, 2012, and January 12, 2013.

A third manga, illustrated by Shinya Inase and titled , was serialized in Square Enix's Big Gangan between October 25, 2011, and October 25, 2012. Two volumes for Inase's manga were released: the first on July 14, 2012 and the second on December 22, 2012. A fourth manga, illustrated by Mutsutake and titled , was serialized in Big Gangan between December 25, 2012, and August 24, 2013. Its chapters were collected in one tankōbon volume, published on October 22, 2013. Square Enix published an anthology volume on March 22, 2013.

Oreshura

Drama CDs and radio show
Hobirecords released two drama CDs in 2011: the first on July 29 and the second on October 28. An Internet radio show, titled Shuraba Radio and hosted by Chiwa Saitō and Junji Majima, started irregular broadcasts on April 28, 2011 and is produced by Hobirecords. A second radio show began broadcasting in December 2012 hosted by Chinatsu Akasaki and Ai Kayano.

Anime
An anime television series adaptation, produced by A-1 Pictures and directed by Kanta Kamei, aired in Japan from January 6 to March 31, 2013. The anime was simulcast by Crunchyroll, subtitled in English. The opening theme is "Girlish Lover" by Chinatsu Akasaki, Yukari Tamura, Hisako Kanemoto and Ai Kayano, and the ending theme is "W:Wonder Tale" by Yukari Tamura.

See also
 Mushi-Uta, another light novel series illustrated by the same illustrator.
 Unbreakable Machine-Doll, another light novel series illustrated by the same illustrator.
 Reincarnated as a Sword, another light novel series illustrated by the same illustrator.

Notes

References

External links
Light novel official website 
Anime official website 

2011 Japanese novels
2011 manga
2012 manga
2013 anime television series debuts
A-1 Pictures
Anime and manga based on light novels
Harem anime and manga
Light novels
Gangan Comics manga
Romantic comedy anime and manga
Seinen manga
Television shows based on light novels
Tokyo MX original programming